Walter William Walsh (April 30, 1897 - January 15, 1966) was a Major League Baseball player. Walsh only played two games, never getting an at-bat for the Philadelphia Phillies in 1920. He was used as a pinch runner in the two games he played.

Walsh was born in Newark, New Jersey and died in Avon-by-the-Sea, New Jersey.

External links

Philadelphia Phillies players
1897 births
1966 deaths
Baseball players from Newark, New Jersey